The Toledo Subdivision is a railroad line owned and operated by CSX Transportation in the U.S. state of Ohio. The line runs from Hamilton (north of Cincinnati) north to Perrysburg (near Toledo) along a former Baltimore and Ohio Railroad line.

The south end of the Toledo Subdivision is at the north end of the Cincinnati Terminal Subdivision, near the east end of the Indianapolis Subdivision. Its north end is at the south end of the Toledo Terminal Subdivision. In between, it junctions with the Middletown Subdivision at New Miami, the Indianapolis Line Subdivision at Sidney, and the Garrett Subdivision at Deshler.

Toledo Subdivision Information

History
South of Dayton, the Toledo Subdivision was opened by the Cincinnati, Hamilton and Dayton Railroad in 1851. Later that decade in 1858, the Dayton and Michigan Railroad opened, continuing the line to Toledo. The lines passed to the Baltimore and Ohio Railroad and CSX through leases and mergers.

Milepost list

References

CSX Transportation lines
Rail infrastructure in Ohio
Baltimore and Ohio Railroad lines